Carlo Innocenzo Carlone or Carloni (1686–1775) was an Italian painter and engraver, active especially in Germany.

Biography
He was a native of Scaria, near Como, in Lombardy, but may have been from the Carloni family of Genoese painters. He was the son of a sculptor, but he preferred painting, and was placed under the care of Giulio Quaglio. He subsequently trained also with Giovanni Battista Colomba. He afterwards studied at Venice and at Rome,  with Francesco Trevisani until he was 23 years of age, when he visited Germany, where he has left works in oil and in fresco at Ludwigsburg, Passau, Linz, Breslau, Prague, and Vienna.

He painted large decorative fresco cycles for palaces in Vienna, Prague and Southern Germany. For example, Carlone is known for painting the ceiling images in the Upper Belvedere of the Belvedere palace complex. His The Glorification of Saints Felix and Adauctus (1759–1761) was commissioned for the cupola of the church of San Felice del Benaco on Lake Garda.
He died at Como.

Works
As an engraver he has left the following plates, mostly from his own compositions:
Conception of the Virgin.
The Holy Family, with St. John kissing the Foot of Jesus.
St Charles Borromeo meeting the Plague-stricken.
The Death of a Saint.
Allegorical subject of Opulence, for a ceiling.
Figure with a Crown, another subject for a ceiling.
Group of Children with a Basket of Flowers.

See also
 Hofburg - winter residence of the Austrian royal family.

References

Sources

External links

1686 births
1775 deaths
People from the Province of Como
17th-century Italian painters
Italian male painters
18th-century Italian painters
Rococo painters
Fresco painters
Catholic painters
Catholic engravers
18th-century Italian male artists